Frank J. Racis (November 9, 1899 – August 19, 1982) was a professional football player from Shenandoah, Pennsylvania. He played during the early years of the National Football League with the Pottsville Maroons, Frankford Yellow Jackets, Boston Bulldogs and Providence Steam Roller.

Career
Straight out of high school, Racis made his professional debut with the  Maroons in 1925. His career lasted 7 seasons. In 1925 Racis helped the Maroons win the NFL Championship, before it was stripped from the team due to a disputed rules violation.

References

Players of American football from Pennsylvania
Boston Bulldogs (NFL) players
Frankford Yellow Jackets players
New York Yankees (NFL) players
Pottsville Maroons players
Providence Steam Roller players
1899 births
1982 deaths
People from Shenandoah, Pennsylvania